The Playboy Morning Show is a live, daily, nationally syndicated talk show that airs internationally on Playboy TV and PlayboyRadio.com, reaching over 85 million households.

The show is an audio/visual version of Playboy and integrates many of the publication's features. The show features celebrity guests, models, and games. It airs live from 9:00AM–10:00AM PST Monday-Thursday and is hosted by Playboy Model Andrea Lowell and stand-up comedian Dan Cummins.

References

External links

Playboy TV original programming
Television series by Playboy Enterprises